Carla Jimenez (born May 14, 1974 in Westwood, Los Angeles, California) is an American television and film actress.

Career
She has had roles in series such as Lincoln Heights, My Name Is Earl and Little Britain USA, and has appeared in films including Miss March (2009) and Phat Girlz (2006).

Jimenez has appeared in Nacho Libre, Lady in the Water, and Accepted. In 2003, Jimenez appeared as a character named Virginia, in the independent cult film My Life with Morrissey by Andrew Overtoom. She was a recurring character on the ABC TV shows Desperate Housewives, Better Off Ted and Last Man Standing. She also played the recurring role of Rosa on Raising Hope.

Jimenez has also appeared in the Netflix sitcom Fuller House, playing an adoption agent for Jesse and Becky. She played Alba, the Pembertons' maid, on FOX's The Mick.

Filmography

Film

Television

Personal life 
Jimenez is of Mexican heritage.

References

External links

CarlaJimenez.com

American film actresses
American television actresses
21st-century American actresses
American actresses of Mexican descent
Living people
1974 births